Dennis White, also known as Latroit and Static Revenger, is an American electronic dance music producer, songwriter and DJ. In 2018 he won the Grammy award for 'Best Remixed Recording' for 'You Move' (Latroit Remix), originally by Depeche Mode.

Biography

Static Revenger
As Static Revenger, he is best known for the ARIA double platinum certified release "I Like That" and "Happy People", which was charted by Fatboy Slim on Beatport as one of the top 10 Dance Music recordings of the decade. As an artist, writer, and producer, he has credits on over 3.5 million records sold worldwide, and seven number-one Billboard club chart remixes for artists such as Swedish House Mafia and Hans Zimmer.

Before using the pseudonym 'Static Revenger', Dennis White got his start in dance music when introduced to Kevin Saunderson from the Detroit techno group Inner City, and was hired as the music director for the Inner City 'Big Fun' world tour from 1989 to 1990 and signing as one of the first artists on KMS Records, Saunderson's record label imprint.

At the conclusion of the Big Fun tour, he went on to found the alternative pop band Charm Farm in Detroit, Michigan. Charm Farm released the album, Pervert, on Mercury Records, scoring minor success with the single "Superstar" (U.S. pop chart #89 in 1996), and performing shows with Detroit artists ranging from Kid Rock and Insane Clown Posse, to Juan Atkins and Richie Hawtin.

In addition to being an artist and producer, White composes for TV and film. He co-wrote "The Zing" with Adam Sandler, which featured the vocals of Sandler, Selena Gomez, CeeLo Green, and Andy Sandberg, and was the closing theme in the Sony Pictures film Hotel Transylvania, which opened at number one at the US box office.

In 2013, Dim Mak Records, which is owned by Steve Aoki, released "Back Off, Bitch!" by Static Revenger featuring Kay, followed by "Colors at Night" in early 2014.

Latroit
As Latroit, White has released recordings with Idris Elba, Inner City (band), Sam Sparro, and Le Youth. He has also remixed recordings for Depeche Mode, Deadmau5, and Nile Rogers. The Latroit remix of "You Move" by Depeche Mode won the 2018 Grammy Award in the 'Best Remixed Recording (Non-Classical)' category.

Latroit's single, "Nice" was featured in the critically acclaimed Apple Phone XR global campaign.

Discography

As Static Revenger
Singles and EPs

Remixes

Music videos

As Latroit

Singles and EPs

Mixes

Remixes

References

Record producers from Michigan
Grammy Award winners
Living people
Year of birth missing (living people)
American house musicians
DJs from Detroit
Electronic dance music DJs